The Talbot Brothers were a musical group based in Bermuda that were among the most popular calypso performers of the 1950s.  The band was composed of brothers Archie (lead singer, acoustic guitar, harmonica), Austin (acoustic guitar, harmonica), Bryan, a.k.a. "Dick" (tipple, a large, 10-stringed ukulele), Ross, a.k.a. "Blackie" (electric guitar) and Roy Talbot (bass), and their cousin Cromwell "Mandy" Mandres (accordion).

Early life and background 
Austin Gerald Talbot (1905-1985), Archibald Maxwell Talbot (1907–1972), Roy Almer Denmond Talbot (1915–2009), Hastings Ross Fanshaw Talbot (1918-2000), and Bryan Kingston Talbot (1920-1979) were the sons of Osmond Charles Fanshaw Talbot and Mamie Susan Kennedy Augusta Lambert, who had married in 1904, with an extended family centred in Tucker's Town (the only part of the Main Island that lies within St. George's Parish) and eastern Hamilton Parish, between Bailey's Bay and Paynter's Vale. Talbots had lived in this area since at least the 18th Century, and the brothers were related by descent to many other families of this area, including the Seon and Outerbridge families. They had five other siblings. Their mother's sister, Ainslie Letitia Dansmore Lambert, married Charles Adolphus Mansfield Manders in 1895, and gave birth to William Cromwell Manders in 1906.

Most of the signatories of the 23 July 1920, petition by residents of Tucker's Town against the planned land acquisitions and redevelopment called for in the "Bermuda Development Company Act (No. 2), 1920" were related to the Talbot Brothers, including their maternal grandfather, Oliver Constantine Lambert (born in Southampton Parish, the son of Samuel Deers Lambert and Ann Newbold), parents Osmond Charles Fanshaw Talbot and Ainslie Letitia Dansmore Manders, maternal uncles Stewart Hastings Lambert and Oliver Ceylon Lambert, maternal aunts Essie Celina Gertrude Lambert, Ann Mahew Constantine Simmons, and Ada Permelia Arlene Simmons, and other relatives Eliza Harriet Talbot (Smith), Rose Ann Smith, Dina Smith (the sister of their maternal grandmother, Rose Ann Lambert, born Rose Ann Smith), and five other Smiths, to whom they were related through both the Lambert (via their maternal grandmother) and Talbot families. Other signatories were Minnie Andrew Palmer, Henry Nelms, Clarkson Frederick Burgess, Henry Thomas Harvey, Oscar Anderson, and Lancelot Laud Havard, the Rector of Hamilton and Smith's Glebe. The petition was unsuccessful and Tucker's Town was compulsorily purchased with Dina Smith the last resident to leave when she was forcibly removed from her property in 1923. Many of their relatives were participants in the civil suit of the descendants of Josiah Smith (the maternal grandfather of Mamie Susan Kennedy Augusta Lambert and Ainslie Letitia Dansmore Lambert) against the Bermuda Development Company in the Supreme Court in 1924 that resulted in compensation paid to the descendants for the land known as the Josiah Smith Estate at Tucker's Town.

Career 

Before achieving a degree of fame with their best-known line-up, the Talbot Brothers had originally been composed in the 1930s of Austin Gerald Talbot, Archibald Maxwell Talbot, Roy Almer Denmond Talbot, and their cousin Ernest Stovell. As the Talbot Brothers, of Tucker's Town, quartet, accompanied by banjo, they won third prize at an amateur concert at the exclusive Coral Island Club in Flatts Village, in Hamilton Parish, on the 1st of March, 1936.

The Talbots were the first of Bermuda's many notable singing groups to gain international acclaim. With a population of fewer than 20,000 scattered over numerous islands totalling 21 square miles, Bermuda had no professional musicians or theatres until the advent of tourism during the latter 19th Century. The tourism industry was pioneered by wealthy visitors from North America, such as Samuel Clemens and Princess Louise, who would winter in Bermuda. New large hotels were built to cater to them, notably the Hamilton Hotel (completed in 1863), the Princess Hotel (completed in 1885), and the Hotel St. George (completed in 1906), and these created employment opportunities for professional musicians. Beyond the hotels, public entertainment relied primarily upon amateur theatrics and music hall-type performances, notably by soldiers assigned to the Bermuda Garrison.

After the First World War, Bermuda's tourism industry went through considerable change as Prohibition led to a flood of affluent middle class visitors seeking sun and alcohol, and Bermuda became a summer rather than a winter destination. The large urban hotels were replaced by resorts sandwiched between private beaches and golf courses, such as the Castle Harbour Hotel, built near Paynter's Vale in the 1920s, and the Elbow Beach Hotel. The construction of the Castle Harbour Hotel (completed in 1931) and the related Mid-Ocean Club had resulted in the forced relocation of the inhabitants of Tucker's Town, with their homes replaced by golf links. The families that had lived there, including the Talbots, were mostly been resettled in Smith's Parish, near Devil's Hole and John Smith's Bay, where Talbot Lane is found today. Bermuda's new visitors demanded entertainments that the genteel community was ill-equipped to provide, including a new type of music. Musical tastes in Bermuda were little different from North America and Britain. West Indian musicians were consequently brought in by the hotels, and local musicians quickly adopted the Calypso they brought with them. The entertainments provided for tourists through the hotels remained separate and quite different, however, from the entertainments that catered to Bermudians, which still relied largely upon amateurs performing in church halls and similar venues.

The Talbots organized in 1942 and performed a variation of Trinidadian calypso in a smooth melodic style influenced by popular music. They performed and recorded cover versions of calypso classics in addition to many of their own originals. They became a popular attraction in local hotels, but it was an early recording they made in the United States that made them even more popular in their homeland, and heralded fame beyond their shores. Bermuda Buggy Ride, according to the essay "Gombeys, Bands and Troubadours" on Bermuda's official website...

Their popularity with American tourists resulted in tours of the U.S. starting in the early 1950s.  Notable in their instrumentation was Roy Talbot's home-made upright bass dubbed the "doghouse."  Roy created the instrument out of a large meat-packing crate and a single fishing line.  This item was a particular curiosity, and during the Talbots’ tours many of their fellow performers and visiting celebrities would autograph the crate.

The Talbots released 10" and 12" vinyl records on the small Audio Fidelity label in the mid-1950s before being signed to ABC Paramount Records in 1957, where they made two LPs that were more accessible in North America.

They were frequent performers on television in the 1950s, appearing on Ed Sullivan's variety shows and other programs.

Archie Talbot composed the title song to the 1956 Columbia motion picture Bermuda Affair.  It is included on their first ABC Paramount LP.

Ross, the penultimate survivor of the group, died in 2000 at the age of 82.  An avid golfer, there is an annual charity golf tournament in Bermuda dedicated to him.

Bassist Roy Talbot, who died on May 15, 2009, was the last surviving brother.

Recordings
Notable songs recorded by The Talbot Brothers include:
"Atomic Nightmare" (Archie Talbot)
"Back to Back (Zombie Jamboree)" (Lord Intruder)
"Bermuda Buggy Ride" (Archie Talbot)
"Bermuda Affair" (Archie Talbot)
"Bermuda’s Still Paradise" (Ross Talbot)
"Castro Twist" (Ross Talbot)
"Old Uncle Joe" (Roy Talbot)
"Give an Ugly Woman Matrimony" (Ross Talbot - F. Reid)
"Gonna Cut You with the Razor" (Archie Talbot - F. Reid)
"Is She Is or Is She Ain’t" (The Charmer)
"Last Train to San Fernando" (Mighty Dictator)
"Nora, Nora" (Lord Kitchener)
"She's Got Freckles On Her But She Is Nice" (no author listed; sometimes attributed to Larry Vincent)
"You Can Go, But You'll Return" (Archie Talbot - F. Reid)

Partial discography
 Bermuda Talbot Brothers in their favorite selections Jay 3009 (10")
 Bermuda Talbot Brothers  ("Bermuda, Vol. 2"); Audio Fidelity AFLP-903 (10”)
 Bermuda Calypso Party ("Bermuda, Vol. 3"); Audio Fidelity AFLP-1807; c.1957
 Calypsos; ABC-Paramount ABC-156; 1957
 Calypso; ABC-Paramount A-156; 1957 (7" E.P.; excerpts from above)
 Talbot Brothers of Bermuda; ABC-Paramount ABC-214
 Talbot Brothers of Bermuda (Volumes 1-3); Talman (reissue)
 Bermuda Holiday; Polyphonic Records (Bermuda) FLP-2001

References

External links
Vinyl Safari
CalypsoWorld.org
"Atomic Nightmare" discussed at Atomic Platters
1959 clip of the Talbots singing "Bermuda Buggy Ride"
1959 clip of the Talbots singing "Yellow Bird"

Bermudian musical groups
Calypso musical groups